Anneta is an unincorporated community located in southern Grayson County, Kentucky, United States.

Geography

Education 
Students in the area attend Grayson County Schools, including Grayson County High School.

Points of interest in and around Anneta 
Loucon Training and Retreat Center  
Moutardier Marina, on the shores of Nolin Lake.

Nearby cities 
Leitchfield, Kentucky 
Clarkson, Kentucky 
Brownsville, Kentucky 
Bee Spring, Kentucky

References 
 

Anneta 
Anneta